John Elder may refer to:
John Elder (pastor) (1706–1792), the "Fighting Parson", founder of the Paxton Boys of Pennsylvania
John Elder (cricketer) (born 1949), Irish cricketer
John Elder (writer) (fl. 1542 – 1565), Scottish cartographer and writer
John Elder (shipbuilder) (1824–1869), Scottish marine engineer and shipbuilder
John Elder (politician), farmer and political figure in Nova Scotia
John Elder (footballer) (1932–2018), Australian rules footballer 
Anthony Hinds (born 1922), British screenwriter and producer who used John Elder as a pseudonym

See also
John Elder Professor of Naval Architecture and Ocean Engineering, Glasgow
Jack Elder (politician) (born 1949), former New Zealand politician
Jack Elder (umpire) (1885–1944), former Australian rules football umpire 
John the Elder
John Elder Robison (born 1956), author of the 2007 memoir Look Me in the Eye,